Ashland is a town in Middlesex County, Massachusetts, United States.  It is part of the MetroWest region. The population was 18,832 at the 2020 United States Census.

History
The area now known as Ashland was settled in the early 18th century and inhabited prior to that by the Megunko Native Americans, to which Megunko Hill owes its name. Previously known as "Unionville", Ashland was incorporated in 1846, bearing the name of statesman Henry Clay's Kentucky estate. It is considerably younger than many of the surrounding towns, as Ashland's territory was taken in near-equal parts from the previously established towns of Hopkinton, Holliston (previously of colonial era Sherborn's territory), and Framingham.

The construction of the Boston & Worcester Railroad, later the Boston & Albany, in the 1830s was key to the early development of the town. Decades later, two other rail lines opened stations in Ashland. Along with the Sudbury River, the railroad helped to attract numerous mills to develop a bustling boot and shoe industry. However, by constructing three reservoirs along the river in 1878, the Boston Water Board inadvertently stymied further growth, most notably by halting the construction of the Dwight Printing Company's granite mills. Although the mills closed, starting in the 1890s the Hopkinton Railroad Company, providing a connection to Milford, and the Natick Street Railway, which operated streetcars between the towns of Sherborn, Framingham, and Natick, offered service in Ashland. These rail lines were gone by the 1920s, rendered obsolete by automobiles.

Around the same time that the local rail lines were in decline, the inventor Henry E. Warren developed the Warren Synchronizing Timer in 1916, which made synchronous electric clocks possible by keeping alternating current flowing from power plants at a consistent sixty cycles per second. Warren founded Telechron, which, in partnership with General Electric, manufactured electric clocks in Ashland until 1979, thirteen years before Telechron itself became defunct. A Warren Synchronizing Timer is on display at the Smithsonian's Museum of American History in Washington D.C., and the Ashland High School sports teams are coined "The Clockers".

For most of the 20th century, Ashland's population remained slow in growth, until the post-war boom beginning in the 1950s. Over time, many farms and open spaces have given way to housing, although some untouched land still remains, including the Ashland Town Forest, Ashland State Park, Warren Woods, and land comprising the beach and dam portions of Hopkinton State Park.

Two major routes, 135 and 126, pass through Ashland. Route 135 is dominated by older residential development of varying density and is also part of the route for the Boston Marathon, which began in Ashland on Pleasant Street until the start was moved to Hopkinton's Main Street in 1924. Route 126 has developed rapidly since the 1980s, as farms have given way to shopping centers and condominiums. A part of the draw of Ashland, and one that has been publicized in recent years, is its "ideal" location about halfway between the cities of Boston and Worcester. Travel is easy, with its own stop on the Framingham/Worcester Commuter Rail Line and nearby access to both I-90 and I-495. Ashland is considered part of MetroWest, which also consists of the towns of Framingham, Holliston, and Hopkinton.

Even though Ashland has left its humble roots as a rural area, it still retains the look and feel of a typical residential Boston-area New England town. Traditions like Ashland Day and small-town favorites like the ice cream shop Murphy's and breakfast joint Sunnyside Cafe maintain the feeling of a close-knit community. Ashland's longstanding rival for the Thanksgiving Day football game is Hopkinton, a rivalry with roots in the formation of the town and the resulting 1846 dispute concerning Ashland's fire engine "Megunko 1."

Geography

Adjacent towns

Ashland is located in eastern Massachusetts, bordered by:
Framingham on the northeast
Sherborn on the east
Holliston on the south
Hopkinton on the southwest
Southborough on the northwest

Climate

Ashland's climate is typical for New England. Winters are variably cold, with frequent Nor'easters and occasional blizzards. The amount decreases dramatically eastward towards Boston because of the influence of the Atlantic Ocean. Snowfall amounts can also decrease rapidly south of Ashland. Low temperatures below zero are not uncommon in winter, and the lowest recent temperatures have been 17 below in January 1994, 14 below in January 2011 and 16 below in February 2016. Average January high temperatures are in the low 30s. Average January low temperatures are in the upper teens. Snow depth can reach two feet or more during the winter season. The winter of 2010–2011 was notable for snow depths of nearly 40 inches during January and February. Nearly 60 inches of snowfall was recorded in Ashland in January 2011 alone. The winter of 2014–2015 saw a very cold February and March. Snow cover lasted from late January until the first week of April. February 2015 was one of the coldest months on record. Snowfall for Ashland was 107.6" for the season. Snow depth reached 45". Spring temperatures can be mitigated by penetrating cold fronts originating from the Canadian Maritimes, known as "backdoor cold fronts". Typically, high temperatures consistently above 70 degrees do not set in until late May. The last frost is usually in mid-May. Summers are generally comfortable, with periods of high humidity. Prolonged heat waves of three or more days with highs of 90 or above are uncommon but can occur. In July 2011 an unusually high temperature of 101 was reached. Average July high temperatures are in the low 80s and average lows are around 60. Severe summer weather is not as common as in areas to the west in Central Massachusetts. However, on July 10, 1989, high winds occurred, causing widespread tree damage through most of Ashland with several homes damaged. This storm was part of a complex of severe storms that spawned several EF0 and EF1 tornadoes in towns in some neighboring counties. Fall is pleasant with the first frost usually around October 1, and the peak of the fall foliage season averages around October 12. Ashland can expect a "white" Christmas slightly over 50 percent of the time.

Demographics

At the 2010 census, there were 16,593 people, 6,385 households and 4,531 families residing in the town. The racial makeup of the town was 84.2% White, 2.4% African American, 0.1% Native American, 8.8% Asian, 2.6% from other races, and 1.9% from two or more races. Hispanic or Latino of any race were 4.5% of the population.

There were 6,484 households, of which 36.7% had children under the age of 18 living with them, 59.0% were married couples living together, 2.7% had a male householder with no wife present, 8.5% had a female householder with no husband present, and 29.8% were non-families. 24.9% of all households were made up of individuals, and 9.1% had someone living alone who was 65 years of age or older. The average household size was 2.51 and the average family size was 3.04.

Of the 16,593 people in the population, 24.9% were under the age of 18, 5.5% were 15 to 19 years of age, 4.1% were 20 to 24 years of age, 27.9% were 25 to 44 years of age, 30.7% were 45 to 64 years of age, and 10.9% were 65 years and over. The median age was 40.1 years. For every 100 females, there was 94.6 males. For every 100 females 18 years and over there were 92.0 males.
 
The median household income was $93,770, and the median family income was $116,799. The median income of individuals working full-time was $79,485 for males versus $60,720 for females. The per capita income for the town was $46,626. About 2.2% of families and 4.0% of the population were below the poverty line, including 3.7% of those under age 18 and 9.6% of those age 65 or over.

Education
In 2005, the town completed the new high school and revised the division of grades. These changes include the 6th grade being moved to join the 7th and 8th grades in the former high school to form what is now Ashland Middle School and moving the 3rd grade from the Henry E. Warren Elementary School into the Mindess Elementary School to join the 4th and 5th grades. The 8th grade students have an annual short field trip to Washington D.C. The kindergarten, 1st and 2nd grades are in the Henry E. Warren Elementary School and preschool is in the William Pittaway School. The graduating class of 2007 was the first class to complete a full year in the new high school. In 2009, a new program at Ashland High School encouraged teachers to "bridge the gap between subjects like math and history to the art world and visually engage students with traditional subject matter." This allowed students to make a connection between the material they were learning in the classroom and the knowledge of the arts and culture.

In 2014, Ashland High School was ranked #19 in the state of Massachusetts (out of 352 schools) and #396 in the country according to U.S. News & World Report. In 2015, Ashland High School was ranked #424 in the country according to Newsweek. In 2016, Ashland High school is ranked #51 among all of the high schools in Massachusetts and #1224 in national school rankings. The mathematics proficiency is at 97% and the English proficiency is at 98% at Ashland High School.

Points of interest

Ashland Farmer's Market
This local farmers market has been operating on Saturdays 9am-1pm June-October each year since 2012.  Around two dozen vendors sell fresh fruit, vegetables, meat, fish, bread, deserts, and crafts along with ready to eat food and coffee. There is also a rotating menu of live music and children's activities.

Ashland Day
Ashland Day is typically held on the third Saturday in September, each year. The festivities occur near the center of town at Stone Park from the morning until the late afternoon, and include a number of booths and various carnival-like rides. Many of the school system's athletic clubs and organizations use the day as an annual fundraising event, but it serves primarily as a day for residents to enjoy numerous activities and delicious food. Traditionally, there are fireworks atop the dam at Hopkinton State Park (the dam is in Ashland), but budget cuts have canceled several recent displays. Ashland Day has only been canceled once, due to inclement weather, in 2004. The 25th Anniversary of the event, was held in 2010. For the first time in several years, fireworks were once again launched from atop the dam at Hopkinton State Park.

Stone's Public House

Built in 1832 by Captain John Stone, to capitalize on the new Boston and Worcester Railroad, The Railroad House, later renamed John Stone's Inn, and now known as Stone's Public House, is located in the center of Ashland.

Stone's is reportedly the site of multiple hauntings. According to legend, the Inn was the site of a murder. Captain Stone is said to have killed a New York salesman named Mike McPherson accidentally after hitting him over the head with a pistol when he suspected McPherson of cheating at poker. It is said that Stone and three friends with whom he had been playing swore to keep the event secret and buried the salesman's body in the Inn's basement. The legend contends that the ghosts of the salesman and the three other players involved all roam the inn. No body has ever been found.

It is rumored that a ten-year-old girl, Mary J. Smith, was struck by a train while playing on the railroad tracks just outside the inn, on June 11, 1862. Onlookers rushed her inside the inn, where she would later succumb to her wounds. A number of employees, patrons, and passersby have reported seeing the apparition of a young girl in a dress, with most reports detailing her looking out various windows that overlook the rear of the building.

The inn was purchased from Herve Beaudoin in 1976 by Leonard "Cappy" Fournier and renovated. During renovations, a hidden chamber was discovered in the basement, and it is speculated that this was used to house runaway slaves who made their way to freedom in the North along the Underground Railroad.

One notable guest of the hotel, Daniel Webster, gave a speech from the balcony on the day the first train arrived in 1834. Joining him for the inaugural train were Governor John Davis and former Governor Levi Lincoln Jr.

Marathon History
Ashland was the original start line for the Boston Marathon from 1897 to 1923. As traditional marathon distances grew, the start line needed to be pushed back to Hopkinton in 1924. There is a small park on Pleasant street in Ashland to remember this history, featuring a sign that reads "It all started here". 
refref

Open Space
Ashland State Park, Hopkinton State Park, Ashland Town Forest, and Warren Woods are all either completely or partially located within town lines.  Both state parks include a lake with hiking, fishing, biking and Swimming.  Hopkinton State Park also has boat rentals and horseback riding trails.  Ashland State Park is 470 acres including a 157-acre reservoir, the 3.5 mile hiking loop around it passes a boat launch, beach, dam and spillway.  The Ashland Town Forest is 550 acres with hiking trails around rock outcroppings, small caves and the rumored ending of some women who escaped the Salem Witch Trials.  The town also owns 100+ acres of land called "Warren Woods" on the South side of town with hiking trails across land once owned by Henry Warren.

Nyanza

US Color and Chemical Company, later named New England Aniline Works, Inc., and finally The Nyanza Color and Chemical Company, had a dye-manufacturing plant in Ashland.  The plant opened in 1917 when American entry into World War I cut off the supply of dyes from Germany, then the world's principal source. In 1971, the factory was identified as a hazard when pollution was discovered in the nearby Sudbury River. The site was placed on the Superfund National Priority List in 1982 when heavy metals and organochlorides were discovered in the soil and water near the site. It was also deemed probable that particles of mercuric sulfate were blown into the air. In 1998, Trustees settled NRD claims with the responsible parties at the Nyanza Chemical Waste Dump Superfund Site for $3 million. $230,769 of the settlement is for groundwater resources. Cleaning up the contaminated site cost residents $55 million, and is still not complete as of 2013. The estates of the Nyanza executives were charged for the cleanup.

In 2006, the Massachusetts State Department of Public Health released a study that found that people who grew up in Ashland between the late 1960s and early 1980s and swam in the waters near Nyanza had a 200-300% higher incidence of cancer than those who were not exposed to the chemicals.

In 2011, the Massachusetts Department of Environmental Protection's Bureau of Waste Site Cleanup's Natural Resource Damages (NRD) program settled with the slowly-going-bankrupt Nyanza for $3 million, which with interest has grown to almost $4 million.  The Nyanza case had previously been at the NRD program of the Massachusetts Executive Office of Energy and Environmental Affairs.

In 2016, proposed housing near Nyanza site raised alarm in Ashland.

In 2020, the EPA proposed a remedy to cleanup groundwater near the site, the final operable unit (phase) of the site cleanup.

Sri Lakshmi Temple
Opened September 6, 1986, Sri Lakshmi Temple is a large regional Hindu temple located on Waverly Street and is the largest such temple in New England. Sri Lakshmi temple hosts several Hindu functions throughout the year.

Transportation
Commuter rail service from Boston's South Station is provided by the MBTA with the Ashland station on its Framingham/Worcester Line. The station is accessible from either Pleasant Street or Memorial Drive (which runs behind Ashland Middle School).

Notable people

 Dave Blass, film and television art director of Cold Case, ER, Justified, Biggest Loser, Beauty and the Geek
 Douglas R. Green, scientist at St. Jude Children's Research Hospital
 Max Lavelle, bassist for the death metal band The Black Dahlia Murder
 Lou Perini, principal owner of the Boston/Milwaukee Braves, 1945–1961
 Jacquelyn Starer, doctor and domestic terrorist, who participated in the January 6 United States Capitol attack
 Henry E. Warren, inventor credited with invention of the first synchronous electric clock which kept time from the oscillations of the power grid, in 1918, as well as with 134 other inventions

See also
Greater Boston
MetroWest
Open town meeting format
Ashland High School

References

External links

Ashland official website
Ashland Historical Society

 
MetroWest
Towns in Middlesex County, Massachusetts
Populated places established in 1750
Towns in Massachusetts